Arthur Lien is an American sketch artist best known for his work depicting the proceedings of the United States Supreme Court. He began his career in courtroom sketch artistry in 1976 after graduating from Maryland Institute College of Art, and by 1978 was the Supreme Court sketch artist for CBS. At the time, many news organizations had their own sketch artist on staff to cover state and federal legislatures and courts, few of which allowed cameras. In the 1980s, many legislatures and courts began to allow video recording of their proceedings. Since then the number of court sketch artists has dwindled. Because the Supreme Court does not allow photography of its proceedings, Lien—along with Bill Hennessy and Dana Verkouteren—is one of the three remaining sketch artists who depicts the courtroom activities, and his sketches are used by a number of news organizations including the New York Times, NBC News, and SCOTUSblog.

References

Citations

Works cited

American artists
Year of birth missing (living people)
Living people
Courtroom sketch artists